Csepel FC is a Hungarian football club located in Budapest, Hungary. It currently plays in Nemzeti Bajnokság III. The team's colors are red and blue.

External links
Official website

Football clubs in Hungary
Association football clubs established in 2006
2006 establishments in Hungary